Rock Creek or Rockcreek may refer to:

Streams

United States
 Rock Creek (California)
 Rock Creek (Fountain Creek tributary), Colorado
 Rock Creek (Idaho)
 Rock Creek (Kankakee River tributary), Illinois
 Rock Creek (Wapsipinicon River tributary), Iowa
 Rock Creek (upper Missouri River tributary), Iowa and Missouri
 Rock Creek (Potomac River tributary), Maryland and the District of Columbia
 Rock Creek (Minnesota)
 Rock Creek (Little St. Francis River tributary), Missouri
 Rock Creek (lower Missouri River tributary), Missouri
 Rock Creek (South Fork South Fabius River tributary), Missouri
 Rock Creek (Johnson County, Texas)
 Rock Creek (Montana)
 Rock Creek (Nebraska)
 Rock Creek (Niobrara River tributary), a stream in Rock County, Nebraska
 Rock Creek (Nevada)
 Rock Creek (Catlow Valley), Oregon
 Rock Creek (John Day River tributary), Oregon
 Rock Creek (Lane County, Oregon)
 Rock Creek (Wasco County, Oregon)
 Rock Creek (Washington County, Oregon)
 Rock Creek (Monocacy River tributary), Pennsylvania
 Rock Creek (Tunkhannock Creek tributary), Pennsylvania
 Rock Creek (Palouse River tributary), Washington
 Rock Creek (Klickitat County, Washington)
 Rock Creek (Clear Creek tributary), Wyoming
 Rock Creek (Medicine Bow River tributary), Wyoming
 Rock Creek (Wheatland Creek tributary), Wyoming

Canada
 Rock Creek (British Columbia)

Communities

United States
 Rock Creek, Alabama, a census-designated place
 Rock Creek, California, a former settlement
 Rock Creek, Illinois (disambiguation)
 Rock Creek, Kansas, an unincorporated community in Rock Creek Township
 Rock Creek, Minnesota, a city
 Rock Creek, Ohio, a village
 Rock Creek, Baker County, Oregon, an unincorporated community 
 Rock Creek, Gilliam County, Oregon, an unincorporated community
 Rockcreek, Oregon, a census-designated place
 Rock Creek, Texas, an unincorporated community
 Rock Creek, Boone County, West Virginia, an unincorporated community
 Rock Creek, Raleigh County, West Virginia, an unincorporated community
 Rock Creek, Wisconsin, a town
 Rock Creek Township (disambiguation)

Canada
 Rock Creek, British Columbia, an unincorporated settlement

Other uses
 Rock Creek Canyon Bridge, British Columbia, Canada
 Rock Creek Cemetery, Washington, D.C.
 Rock Creek Gold Rush, near the town of Rock Creek, British Columbia
 Rock Creek Methodist Episcopal Church, in Maryland
 Rock Creek Park, Washington, D.C., an urban park
 Rock Creek Park Golf Course, Washington, D.C.
 Rock Creek Railway, a historic electric streetcar company in Washington, D.C.
 Rock Creek Roadless Area, Wyoming
 Rock Creek State Park, Iowa
 Rock Creek Station, a Pony Express station in Nebraska
 Rock Creek Station and Stricker Homesite, a historic site in Idaho
 Rock Creek USD 323, a school district in Kansas
 Rock Creek Trail, Colorado
 Rock Creek Wilderness, Oregon

See also
 Rock Creek Gardens, Washington, D.C., a neighborhood
 Rock Creek Park, Colorado, an unincorporated community and census-designated place
 Rock Creek Woods Historic District, Maryland
 Rock/Creek, an outdoor specialty retailer
 Rock Creek and Potomac Parkway, Washington, D.C.
 Rock Branch (disambiguation)
 Rock Run (disambiguation)